The Kowloon British School was a school established in Hong Kong for the education of the children of expatriates at the turn of the 20th century.

History
The school was built at 136 Nathan Road, Tsim Sha Tsui, Kowloon and is the oldest surviving school building constructed for the expatriate community in Hong Kong. In 1900, Mr. Ho Tung (later Sir Robert) donated $15,000 to the Government to set up a school in Kowloon. The building was officially opened by Governor Blake on 19 April 1902. 

The school was officially opened as a primary school for some 60 pupils but it was converted to a secondary school for some 300 students in the mid-1930s. The school remained at this building until 1937 when it relocated to 2 Tin Kwong Road in Ho Man Tin. The school was closed in August 1940 after children were ordered out of Hong Kong as World War II began to impact Hong Kong. The school reopened in the summer of 1946 and was renamed King George V School in 1948.

The building is a typical Victorian structure but was modified to adapt to the local climat by adding wide verandas, high ceilings and pitched roofs.

The Family Welfare Association and Tsim Sha Tsui Kaifong Association used the building after the Second World War. Having been restored, it now houses the Antiquities and Monuments Office. 

It became a declared monument of Hong Kong on 19 July 1991.

See also
King George V School: the former Kowloon British School is forerunner of this school.

References

Tsim Sha Tsui
Declared monuments of Hong Kong
Government buildings in Hong Kong
King George V School (Hong Kong)